Kololo is a hill in Kampala, Uganda.

Kololo may also refer to:

People
 Kololo people, a Sotho people of Southern Africa
 Kololo language, a Sotho language of the Kololo people and the Lozi of Zambia

Places
 Kololo Game Reserve, South Africa
 Kololo Peaks, a mountain in Washington, US
 Kololo Senior Secondary School, Kampala, Uganda